Prince Joachim may refer to:
Prince Joachim of Denmark (born 1969)
Prince Joachim of Prussia (1890–1920)
Prince Joachim of Belgium, Archduke of Austria-Este (born 1991)
Prince Joachim Albert of Prussia (1876–1939), House of Hohenzollern